is a 2009 sports and party game developed by Sega. Like its predecessor, it was published by Nintendo for Japan and Korea and by Sega in the Western world. The game is officially licensed by the International Olympic Committee (IOC) through exclusive license International Sports Multimedia. The game is the third official crossover title to feature characters from both Mario and Sonic's respective universes, the first and second being the game's predecessor Mario & Sonic at the Olympic Games and Super Smash Bros. Brawl respectively. It was released on the Wii and the Nintendo DS in October 2009, and is the first official video game of the 2010 Winter Olympic Games.

Mario & Sonic on the Wii and DS is a collection of events based on the Olympic Winter Games. Players can assume the role of a Mario or Sonic character while competing against the others in these events. The game features all of the playable characters that were present in its predecessor, as well as four new characters.

The game was a critical and commercial success, selling 5.67 million copies worldwide and receiving positive reviews from critics. A third installment, named Mario & Sonic at the London 2012 Olympic Games, was released for the Wii in November 2011 and on the 3DS in February 2012.

Gameplay
Mario & Sonic at the Olympic Winter Games retains the gameplay mechanics of its predecessor, controlling an on-screen character through authentic Olympic events with the specific tailored controls for the Wii and DS. Unlike its predecessor, some of the events in the Wii game can use the Balance Board accessory, but it is not a requirement.

All of the playable characters from the previous game return in addition to four new characters. It has been announced via the Nintendo Channel, that this game will have WiiConnect24 capability and the player can use their Miis in-game. A new feature added to the player's Mii is the ability to customize the Mii's clothes.
The sequel introduces a Festival mode in the Wii version that allows the player to make their way through the entire Olympic Games, from opening ceremony to closure. The multiplayer mode offers "co-op and competitive gameplay" whereas the DS version will use its wireless capabilities. The DS counterpart has "Adventure Tours" where players can accept quests and challenge bosses and to stop Dr. Eggman and Bowser before they can stop the Olympics by kidnapping the Snow Spirits. DS Download Play is possible for those without an individual copy of the game.

Development

In January 2009, a rumor from Spanish Nintendo magazine Nintendo Acción mentioned a sequel to Mario & Sonic at the Olympic Games would be created for the 2010 Winter Olympics. Both IGN and Eurogamer received confirmation on the games' existence, with IGN stating the game will be announced within the following month. Dennis Kim, licensing and merchandising director for the event, stated in February that a Mario & Sonic title "[is] being discussed and planned for Vancouver". Kim also stated "Vancouver 2010" and the IOC will share royalties from this game. In the same month, the sequel titled "Mario & Sonic at the Olympic Winter Games" was officially announced via a joint press release by Sega and Nintendo on February 12, 2009. The game was announced as being developed by Sega Japan under the supervision of Shigeru Miyamoto. This title is the third video game collaboration between Nintendo and Sega. According to gaming site IGN, development began immediately after the initial Olympic game was released in November 2007.  In the months leading to the game's release, in which Nintendo unveiled and released the Wii MotionPlus accessory, Sega contemplated adding support for the accessory in the Wii version, but ultimately nixed it because the developers were not sure whether the Wii MotionPlus would be widely used.  It was later incorporated into Mario & Sonic at the Sochi 2014 Olympic Winter Games for the Wii U.

An iPhone OS app version was released in January 2010 by Sega. Due to only containing Sonic characters, the game is simply titled Sonic at the Olympic Winter Games.

Reception

The Wii version of Mario & Sonic at the Olympic Winter Games received a generally positive reaction from critics. The Wii version had a higher score than the DS version.  GameRankings lists the average scores as 77.86% for the Wii version and 70.95% for the DS. IGN said of the Wii version that "Most of the events also use a whole lot of waggle or over-exaggerated controls where it could have made for a better experience", giving the Wii version a 6.5. X-Play's Adam Sessler asserted that the Wii version of the game is not that hard and the events interesting, but he claimed that the controls are too easy, despite praising the Dream Events. Accordingly, he gave it a 3 out of 5. GameSpot agreed, criticizing the uninteresting mission objectives in the DS version. Nintendo Power was very disappointed that players can still use Wi-Fi only for worldwide rankings. No online play is available. GameTrailers also gave the Wii game a 5.2, criticizing the hit and miss motion controls. GamePro agreed, stating that "Where the original had a sense of novelty and charm, the sequel feels a little dated and tired."

GamesMaster praised the game, saying that it "justifies the hype." Eurogamer also praised the game, stating that "It's true to say that Mario & Sonic at the Olympic Winter Games is no Mario Kart. But it's a fun, polished party game with broad appeal, and a marked improvement over the previous one." Gamervision praised the game also, stating that "Mario & Sonic at the Olympic Winter Games isn’t going to surprise anyone with its gameplay, graphics, controls, or concept, but it’s a perfectly serviceable party game for the Wii." Nintendo Life praised the events of the game, giving it a 9/10. IGN called the DS version "impressive", giving it a 7.5.

By December 31, 2009, the game had sold approximately 5.67 million copies, making it Sega's best-selling game in the fiscal year starting that March.

Sonic at the Olympic Winter Games 

 is a sports game developed by Venan Entertainment and published by Sega for iOS.  It was released on January 30, 2010, but has since been unexpectedly removed from the App Store with no comment by Sega or Apple. The game is officially licensed by the International Olympic Committee (IOC) through exclusive license International Sports Multimedia, and takes place at the 2010 Winter Olympics.

Sonic at the Olympic Winter Games follows the release of the similarly titled Mario & Sonic at the Olympic Winter Games with similar gameplay and setting, but with the absence of Nintendo-owned characters.  In comparison, the game also features fewer events, fewer characters, and fewer modes. It received moderate reviews, exemplified by a five out of ten rating from IGN.

Notes

References

External links
 

2009 video games
2010 Winter Olympics
Mario & Sonic at the Olympic Games
Mario sports games
Crossover video games
Nintendo DS games
Nintendo Wi-Fi Connection games
Racjin games
Sega video games
Sports video games set in Canada
Video game sequels
Video games scored by Jun Senoue
Video games scored by Tomoya Ohtani
Video games set in 2010
Video games set in Vancouver
Wii Wi-Fi games
Wii games
Wii Balance Board games
Winter Olympic video games
Video games developed in Japan
Multiplayer and single-player video games